Seri is a genus of flat-footed flies in the family Platypezidae.

Species
Seri dymka (Kessel, 1961)
Seri obscuripennis (Oldenberg, 1917)

References

Platypezidae
Platypezoidea genera
Taxa named by Edward L. Kessel